U.S. News & World Report (USNWR) is an American media company that publishes news, consumer advice, rankings, and analysis. It was launched in 1948 as the merger of domestic-focused weekly newspaper U.S. News and international-focused weekly magazine World Report. In 1995, the company launched 'usnews.com' and in 2010, the magazine ceased printing.

The company's rankings of American colleges and universities are popular with the general public and influence application patterns.

History

Following the closure of United States Daily (1926–1933), David Lawrence (1888–1973) (who also started World Report in 1946) founded United States News in 1933. The two magazines covered national and international news separately, but Lawrence merged them into U.S. News & World Report in 1948. He subsequently sold the magazine to his employees. Historically, the magazine tended to be slightly more conservative than its two primary competitors, Time and Newsweek, and focused more on economic, health, and education stories. It also eschewed sports, entertainment, and celebrity news. Important milestones in the early history of the magazine include the introduction of the "Washington Whispers" column in 1934 and the "News You Can Use" column in 1952. In 1958, the weekly magazine's circulation passed one million and reached two million by 1973.

Since 1983, it has been known primarily for its influential ranking and annual reports of colleges and graduate schools, spanning across most fields and subjects. U.S. News & World Report is America's oldest and best-known ranker of academic institutions, and covers the fields of business, law, medicine, engineering, education, social sciences and public affairs, in addition to many other areas. Its print edition was consistently included in national bestseller lists, augmented by online subscriptions. Additional rankings published by U.S. News & World Report include hospitals, medical specialties and automobiles.

In October 1984, publisher and real estate developer Mortimer Zuckerman purchased U.S. News & World Report. Zuckerman had owned the New York Daily News. In 1993, U.S. News & World Report entered the digital world by providing content to CompuServe and in 1995, the website usnews.com was launched. In 2001, the website won the National Magazine Award for General Excellence Online. In 2007, U.S. News & World Report published its first list of the nation's best high schools. Its ranking methodology included state test scores and the success of poor and minority students on these exams, and schools' performance in Advanced Placement exams.

Starting in June 2008, the magazine reduced its publication frequency in three steps. In June 2008, citing a decline overall in magazine circulation and advertising, U.S. News & World Report announced that it would become a biweekly publication, starting January 2009. It hoped advertisers would be attracted to the schedule, which allowed ads to stay on newsstands a week longer. However, five months later the magazine changed its frequency again, becoming monthly. In August 2008, U.S. News expanded and revamped its online opinion section. The new version of the opinion page included daily new op-ed content as well as the new Thomas Jefferson Street blog. An internal memo was sent on November 5, 2010, to the staff of the magazine informing them that the "December issue will be our last print monthly sent to subscribers, whose remaining print and digital replica subscriptions will be filled by other publishers." The memo went on to say that the publication would be moving to a primarily digital format but that it would continue to print special issues such as "the college and grad guides, as well as hospital and personal finance guides". Prior to ending physical publication, U.S. News was generally the third-ranked general American newsmagazine after Time and Newsweek. A weekly digital magazine, U.S. News Weekly, introduced in January 2009, continued to offer subscription content until it ceased at the end of April 2015.

The company is owned by U.S. News & World Report, L.P., a privately held company, with a headquarters in Washington, D.C. and advertising, sales and corporate offices in New York and New Jersey. The company's move to the Web made it possible for U.S. News & World Report to expand its service journalism with the introduction of several consumer-facing rankings products. The company returned to profitability in 2013. The leadership team includes Executive Chairman Eric Gertler, President & CEO William Holiber, CFO/COO Neil Maheshwari and Kim Castro, editor and chief content officer. Brian Kelly was the chief content officer from April 2007 – August 2019. The company is owned by media proprietor Mortimer Zuckerman.

Rankings

Who Runs America?
The first of U.S. News & World Reports rankings was its "Who Runs America?" surveys. These ran in the spring of each year from 1974 to 1986. The magazine would have a cover typically featuring persons selected by the USN & WR as being the ten most powerful persons in the United States. Every single edition of the series listed the President of the United States as the most powerful person, but the #2 position included such persons as Secretary of State Henry Kissinger (1974), Federal Reserve Chairmen Paul Volcker and Arthur Burns (each listed multiple years) and US Senator Edward Kennedy (1979). While most of the top ten each year were officials in government, occasionally others were included, including TV anchormen Walter Cronkite and Dan Rather, Chase Manhattan Bank Chairman David Rockefeller, AFL–CIO leader George Meany, and consumer advocate Ralph Nader. The only woman to make the top ten list was First Lady Rosalynn Carter in 1980.

In addition to these overall top ten persons, the publication also included top persons in each of several fields, including education, business, finance, journalism, and many other areas. The survey was discontinued after 1986.

Best Colleges

Best Global Universities

In October 2014, U.S. News & World Report published its inaugural "Best Global Universities" rankings. Inside Higher Ed noted that U.S. News is entering into the international college and university rankings area that is already "dominated by three major global university rankings," namely the Times Higher Education World University Rankings, the Academic Ranking of World Universities, and the QS World University Rankings. Robert Morse, "U.S. News’s chief data strategist," stated that "it's natural for U.S. News to get into this space." Morse also noted that U.S. News "will also be the first American publisher to enter the global rankings space".

Best Hospitals

Since 1990, U.S. News & World Report has compiled the Best Hospitals rankings. The Best Hospitals rankings are specifically based on a different methodology that looks at difficult (high acuity) cases within 16 specialties, including cancer; diabetes and endocrinology; ear, nose and throat; gastroenterology; geriatrics; gynecology; heart and heart surgery; kidney disorders; neurology and neurosurgery; ophthalmology; orthopedics; psychiatry; pulmonology; rehabilitation; rheumatology; and urology. In addition to rankings for each of these specialties, hospitals that excel in many U.S. News areas are ranked in the Honor Roll.

Best Cars
Since 2007, U.S. News has developed an innovative rankings system for new and used automobiles. The rankings span over 30 classes of cars, trucks, SUVs, minivans, wagons, and sports cars. Each automobile receives an overall score, as well as a performance, interior, and recommendation score to the nearest tenth on a 1–10 scale. Scores are based on the consensus opinion of America's trusted automotive experts, as well as reliability and safety data. U.S. News also produces annual "Best Cars for the Money" and "Best Cars for Families" awards across approximately 20 classes of cars, trucks, SUVs, and minivans. Money award winners are derived by combining vehicle price and five-year cost of ownership with the opinion of the automotive press, while family awards are tabulated by combining critics' opinions with the vehicle's availability of family-friendly features and interior space, as well as safety and reliability data. Money and family award winners are announced in February and March of each year, respectively.

Best States

In 2017, U.S. News published its first ranking of all 50 U.S. states, incorporating metrics in seven categories: health care, education, crime and corrections, infrastructure, opportunity, economy, and government. The weighting of the individual categories in determining overall rank was informed by surveys on what matters most to residents. Massachusetts occupied the top rank, and Louisiana ranked worst.

In 2018 the 8 categories were: health care, education, economy, opportunity, infrastructure, crime & corrections, fiscal stability, and quality of life. Iowa occupied the top rank, and Louisiana ranked worst.

In 2019 natural environment replaced the quality of life category. Washington occupied the top rank, and Louisiana ranked worst.

The ranking was not published in 2020. In 2021, Washington, Minnesota, and Utah topped the list, while New Mexico, Mississippi, and Louisiana ranked worst.

See also
 Washington Monthly

References

 
Online magazines published in the United States
Biweekly magazines published in the United States
Defunct magazines published in the United States
Magazines disestablished in 2010
Magazines established in 1933
Magazines published in Washington, D.C.
Online magazines with defunct print editions
News magazines published in the United States